

Federal

New South Wales

Queensland

Tasmania

South Australia

Victoria

Western Australia

See also
List of political controversies in Australia

References

Politicians
Australian politicians
Convicted of crimes